Mike'd Up was Mike Francesa's Sunday late-night sports talk show on WNBC-TV.  On July 19, 2011, Francesa announced on WFAN that he will end the show so he can spend more time with his family. WNBC's head sports anchor, Bruce Beck succeeded Francesa as show host.  In September 2013, WNBC renamed the program, Sports Final.

Program format 
Monologue about the sports news of the day, followed by interview discussion with guests who have either direct or indirect significance with the following franchises:

 New York Yankees
 New York Mets
 New York Giants
 New York Jets
 New York Knicks (seldom)
 Brooklyn Nets (seldom)

On location 
Mike'd Up was at the newly expanded Rutgers Stadium on Sunday, September 6, 2009.

References

American television talk shows
American late-night television shows